Lincoln Township is a township in Cloud County, Kansas, USA.  As of the 2000 census, its population was 378.

History
Lincoln Township was organized in 1873.

Geography
Lincoln Township covers an area of  surrounding the county seat of Concordia.

The stream of Wolf Creek runs through this township.

References

 USGS Geographic Names Information System (GNIS)

External links
 US-Counties.com
 City-Data.com

Townships in Cloud County, Kansas
Townships in Kansas